Bolshoye Dolzhenkovo is a rural locality and the administrative center of Dolzhenkovsky Selsoviet Rural Settlement, Oktyabrsky District, Kursk Oblast, Russia. Population:

Geography 
The village is located on the Rogozna River (a right tributary of the Seym River), 72 km from the Russia–Ukraine border, 20 km south-west of Kursk, 6 km north-west of the district center – the urban-type settlement Pryamitsyno.

 Streets
There is Novaya Street and 272 houses.

 Climate
Bolshoye Dolzhenkovo has a warm-summer humid continental climate (Dfb in the Köppen climate classification).

Transport 
Bolshoye Dolzhenkovo is located 15 km from the federal route  Crimea Highway (a part of the European route ), 6 km from the road of regional importance  (Kursk – Lgov – Rylsk – border with Ukraine), 0.3 km from the road of intermunicipal significance  (Dyakonovo – Starkovo – Sokolovka), on the road  (38N-073 – Bolshoye Dolzhenkovo via Avdeyeva), 7 km from the nearest railway halt 439 km (railway line Lgov I — Kursk).

The rural locality is situated 31 km from Kursk Vostochny Airport, 127 km from Belgorod International Airport and 234 km from Voronezh Peter the Great Airport.

References

Notes

Sources

Rural localities in Oktyabrsky District, Kursk Oblast